Local Valley is the fourth studio album by Swedish singer-songwriter José González, released on 17 September 2021 by City Slang and Mute Records.

It succeeds González's third studio album Vestiges and Claws, which was released in 2015, as well as the live album Live in Europe.

Four singles preceded Local Valley, including "El Invento", "Visions" "Head On", and "Swing".

Background 
Local Valley was recorded and produced by José González at Studio Koltrast in Hakefjorden and Studio Koltrast in Linné, Sweden. "Line of Fire" is a re-recording of the 2013 song of the same name by González's band, Junip.

Critical reception 

Local Valley received positive reviews from music critics. At Metacritic, which assigns a normalized rating out of 100 to reviews from mainstream critics, the album received an average score of 76, based on 12 reviews, indicating "generally favorable reviews". Aggregator AnyDecentMusic? gave it 7.3 out of 10, based on their assessment of the critical consensus. In an 8/10 review, Sam Richards of Uncut wrote, "His always inventive finger- picking is more expansive and fluid, his vocals less vexed, his melodies more direct. As a result, "Visions" might be the best song he's written since his 2003 debut single "Crosses"." Victoria Segal of Mojo wrote, "Local Valley has no lows, nor any thrilling highs, but it's an even, easy pleasure from start to finish."

Track listing 

Notes
  signifies an additional lyricist

Charts

References

2021 albums
Indie folk albums
Folk albums by Swedish artists